John Mackie (died 3 July 1858) was a British Whig politician.

He was elected Whig MP for Kirkcudbrightshire at a by-election in 1850—caused by Thomas Maitland's appointment as a senator of the College of Justice—and held the seat until the 1857 general election, when he stepped down in favour of his son James Mackie.

References

External links
 

Whig (British political party) MPs for Scottish constituencies
UK MPs 1847–1852
UK MPs 1852–1857
1858 deaths